DPPA may refer to:

 Diphenylphosphoryl azide
 Driver's Privacy Protection Act, a 1994 federal U.S. law concerning privacy of DMV information
 United Nations Department of Political and Peacebuilding Affairs, a department of the United Nations Secretariat